Acemetacin is a non-steroidal anti-inflammatory drug (NSAID) used for the treatment of osteoarthritis, rheumatoid arthritis, lower back pain, and relieving post-operative pain. It is manufactured by Merck KGaA under the tradename Emflex, and is available in the UK and other countries as a prescription-only drug.

Medical uses 
Acemetacin has proven effective in the treatment of osteoarthritis, rheumatoid arthritis, ankylosing spondylitis, and other kinds of rheumatoid inflammation, as well as in post-operative and post-traumatic pain and attack of gout. Application of a single dose of acemetacin for post-operative pain is not well supported by studies.

Contraindications 
Contraindications are basically the same as with other NSAIDs: hypersensitivity reactions to NSAIDs in the past (typically asthma or skin reactions), gastrointestinal or cerebral bleeding, peptic ulcer, haematopoietic disorders (anaemia, leukopenia), and during the third trimester of pregnancy.

Adverse effects 
Common side effects (in about 1–10% of patients) include gastrointestinal problems typical of NSAIDs, such as nausea, diarrhoea, stomach pain, and peptic ulcer; central nervous effects like headache and dizziness; and skin reactions. Gastrointestinal tolerability is better than that of the related drug indometacin. Severe allergic reactions and haematopoietic disorders occur in fewer than 0.01% of patients.

Interactions 
The following interactions, typical of NSAIDs, have been described:
 other NSAIDs, corticosteroids: increased frequency of side effects, especially peptic ulcers and gastrointestinal bleeding
 diuretics, ACE inhibitors and other antihypertensive drugs: reduced effectiveness of these drugs
 with ACE inhibitors or ciclosporin, increased risk of kidney function disorders
 anticoagulants such as warfarin: increased risk of bleeding
 increased blood plasma concentrations of digoxin and methotrexate
 decreased plasma concentrations of lithium

Pharmacology 

Acemetacin acts as an inhibitor of cyclooxygenase (COX), producing the anti-inflammatory and analgetic (pain relieving) effects. In the body, it is partly metabolized to indometacin, which also acts as a COX inhibitor. The same mechanism is responsible for the antipyretic and antiplatelet effects, which are however not clinically used, as well as for the typical NSAID adverse effects.

An advantage of acemetacin is that it reduces gastric damage as compared to indometacin, possibly because acemetacin has less effect on the increase of leukotriene B4 synthesis and tumor necrosis factor (TNF) expression, leading to less induction of leukocyte-endothelial adherence.

Pharmacokinetics 

The substance is quickly and almost completely absorbed from the gut. Highest blood plasma concentrations are reached after two hours. It is bound to plasma proteins to 80–90%. Concentrations in the synovial fluid and membranes, muscle and bone are higher than in the blood.

Apart from the active metabolite indometacin, a number of inactive metabolites are found after application of acemetacin: the O-desmethyl-, des-4-chlorobenzoyl-, and O-desmethyl-des-4-chlorobenzoyl derivatives of both indometacin and acemetacin, as well as all of these substances' glucuronides (mediated at least partly by the enzyme UGT2B7). Elimination half-life is 4.5±2.8 hours (in some individuals up to 16 hours) under steady state conditions. 40% are eliminated via the kidney, and 50% via the faeces.

Chemistry 
Acemetacin is the glycolic acid ester of indometacin. It is polymorphic, with four known anhydrous (water-free) and two monohydrate crystalline forms.

Society and culture

Brand names 
Other brand names include Zadex (Hungary),  Rheutrop (Austria), Acemetadoc, Acephlogont, Azeat, Rantudil (Germany, Hungary, Mexico, Poland, Portugal, Turkey), Gamespir (Greece), Oldan, Reudol (Spain), Tilur (Switzerland), ACEO (Taiwan), Ost-map (Egypt).

References 

Indoles
Acetic acids
Carboxamides
Merck brands
Indole ethers at the benzene ring
Chloroarenes
Prodrugs
Nonsteroidal anti-inflammatory drugs